"Idioteque" is a song by the English rock band Radiohead, released on their fourth album, Kid A (2000). Radiohead developed it while experimenting with modular synthesisers and sampling.

A live version appears on the 2001 EP I Might Be Wrong: Live Recordings. "Idioteque" was included on Radiohead: The Best Of (2008). It was named one of the best songs of the decade by Pitchfork. In 2021, Rolling Stone ranked it number 48 on their list of the "500 Greatest Songs of All Time".

Recording
"Idioteque" began with a rhythm created by Jonny Greenwood on a modular synthesiser. Feeling it "needed chaos", he experimented with found sounds and sampling. He recorded 50 minutes of improvisation and gave it to the singer, Thom Yorke, who took a short sequence and used it to write the song. Yorke said: "Some of it was just 'what?', but then there was this section of about 40 seconds long in the middle of it that was absolute genius, and I just cut that up." As with other songs on Kid A, he created lyrics by cutting up phrases and drawing them from a hat. In the second chorus, Yorke's vocals are rearranged so that he seems to say "the first of the children" in 5/4, creating a grouping dissonance against the original 4/4 chorus.

Greenwood could not remember where the four-chord synthesiser phrase had come from, and assumed he had played it himself. He later realised he had sampled it from mild und leise, a computer music piece by the American composer Paul Lansky. Lansky wrote mild und leise in 1973 at Princeton University on an IBM mainframe computer using FM synthesis; it was released on the 1975 compilation First Recordings – Electronic Music Winners, which Greenwood discovered in a second-hand record shop while Radiohead were touring the US. Lansky allowed Radiohead to use the sample after Greenwood wrote to him with a copy of "Idioteque". In an essay about the experience, Lansky wrote that he found Radiohead's use of the sample "imaginative and inventive" and that he had himself "sampled" the chord progression by using the Tristan chord. "Idioteque" also samples another composition from Electronic Music Winners, "Short Piece", by Arthur Kreiger, who became a professor of music at Connecticut College.

Reception 

"Idioteque" was named the eighth-best song of the decade by Pitchfork and the 56th-best by Rolling Stone. In 2018, Rolling Stone ranked it the 33rd greatest song of the century so far. In 2021, Rolling Stone ranked "Idioteque" number 48 on its list of the "500 Greatest Songs of All Time", describing it as "the foreboding, spellbinding centrepiece of Kid A".

Cover versions
Levi Weaver covered "Idioteque" live on his 2006 tour supporting Imogen Heap, using multiple loop pedals to build a layered effect. A studio version is also on his 2007 album You Are Never Close to Home, You Are Never Far from Home. In July 2010, Amanda Palmer released it as the first single from her Radiohead covers album; her cover was National Public Radio's Song of the Day for January 11, 2011. In 2010, Yoav used a loop pedal to build a layered acoustic version.

Personnel

Radiohead 

 Colin Greenwood
 Jonny Greenwood
 Ed O'Brien
 Philip Selway
 Thom Yorke

Additional personnel

 Nigel Godrich production, engineering, mixing
 Gerard Navarro production assistance, additional engineering
 Graeme Stewart additional engineering

References

External links
Radiohead Official Site
Homepage of Paul Lansky: explanation by the composer of the song's relationship with his piece mild und leise, including a sample of it.

2000 songs
Radiohead songs
Song recordings produced by Nigel Godrich
Songs written by Thom Yorke
Songs written by Colin Greenwood
Songs written by Jonny Greenwood
Songs written by Philip Selway
Songs written by Ed O'Brien
Songs about climate change